Ata Teaotai OBE is an I-Kiribati political figure.

In 1978, he was part of a delegation that negotiated for independence of Kiribati from Britain. He was from 28 May 1994 to 1 October 1994 acting President of Kiribati as Chairman of the State Council.

References

Year of birth missing (living people)
Living people
Presidents of Kiribati
Government ministers of Kiribati
Officers of the Order of the British Empire
People from the Gilbert Islands